Platteville is the largest city in Grant County in southwestern Wisconsin. The population was 11,836 at the 2020 census, up from 11,224 at the 2010 census. Much of this growth is likely due to the enrollment increase of the University of Wisconsin–Platteville. It is the principal city of the Platteville Micropolitan Statistical area, which has an estimated population of 49,681. Platteville is located atop the greater Platte River valley in the southern Driftless Region of Wisconsin, an area known for its karst topography and rolling hills.

History 

Platteville was settled by pioneers and early lead miners along inlets and flat groves of The Rountree Branch and Platte River, which form part of the greater Upper Mississippi River system in the southwest Driftless Region of Wisconsin.

Areas of town are carved by ridges, narrow valleys, and steep hills. The influence of geography can also be seen in the irregularity of the streets in the community. As the town grew, roads were given odd routes, to avoid the steep ravines and mining shafts strewn about the locality.

Platteville was officially founded in 1829 by John H. Rountree, a southern businessman who had moved to the region prior, in hopes of finding wealth during its lead rush. The town became a flourishing mining community in part due to its close proximity to Dubuque, Iowa & Galena, Illinois. Both were thriving cities along the Mississippi River trade route that benefited from the rising demand for lead throughout the United States from the 1820’s–1850’s.

John H. Rountree as well as other wealthy southerners in the area, like former Wisconsin Governor Henry Dodge, brought slaves with them during the lead rush. They also brought freed black laborers, with intentions for them to work the mines at a more affordable cost, often nothing. Although unpaid labor was illegal, it was practiced in the region until after the Civil War.

A family of freed African-Americans from the region later settled a community known as Pleasant Ridge, Grant County, Wisconsin just west of Platteville. This served as a safe haven for many coming up from Arkansas, Tennessee, and Mississippi. Some stayed and raised families but most continued on their way in hopes of finding success elsewhere.

By the 1849s lead ore production was decreasing. However, the mining of zinc ore quickly filled the void for prospective work. Platteville had become an established town, complete with schools, a private preparatory academy, newspaper, several churches, and a telegraph service as of November 1849.

During this time, both a teachers' college and a mining college were founded. The normal school was established on October 9, 1866 to train teachers for elementary school grades. The Wisconsin Mining Trade School opened in January 1908.

In 1959, these two colleges were merged to become Wisconsin State College and Institute of Technology. Its curriculum was developed to add graduate programs and departments, particularly in engineering. In 1971 it was renamed as University of Wisconsin–Platteville, to reflect its expanded programs in graduate study. Other additions included criminal justice and, in the early 21st century, UW Platteville is also considered to have the best criminal justice college in the Midwest.

From 1984 until 2001 the Chicago Bears football team held summer training camp on the campus of University of Wisconsin–Platteville. Their program resulted in a substantial infusion of money into the local economy each summer. The town felt the decline after the Bears moved their training camp to Olivet Nazarene University in Illinois.

In 2004, the University of Wisconsin System gave its approval to the University of Wisconsin–Platteville's plan to expand the student enrollment from 5,000 to 7,500.

In 2004, U.S. Highway 151 was upgraded to a limited-access highway; it bypassed the city south  of Platteville. Prior to the upgrade, the highway exits were closer to Platteville. The city made changes to adjust to the new southern US 151 bypass, and it has influenced subsequent development. A new hospital was built just north of US 151 and next to its off ramps. A Walmart Supercenter and a Menards have opened near the northern end of the US 151 bypass.

Historic buildings

Economy 
Platteville is a college town, with a population and economy strongly influenced by the university. It has had some development in the white-collar sector. That growth is a result of the increasing number of engineering firms locating in Platteville to take advantage of being associated with UW-P's engineering program. More recently there has been development in the blue-collar sector as well due to the increased construction activity throughout the community.

Geography 

Platteville is located at  (42.73707, −90.477501). It is in the Hollow Region, as named by early southern miners, in the rolling hills of southwestern Wisconsin.

Platteville is serviced by Wisconsin State Highways 80 and 81, as well as U.S. Highway 151. Originally, U.S. 151 went through the valley that made up the southern border of the city limits, but with the completion of the four-lane limited-access superhighway, traffic has been rerouted and now loops south of the city.

The minerals in the area consist of galena, a sulfide of lead (lead 86.6, sulfur 13.4).  Sphalerite or zinc sulfide is also, common in the region. Zinc and lead mining were in heavy production through the 1820s–1920s. Consequently, there are few straight streets in Platteville. As a result of the mining in the 1800s leaving a honeycomb of abandoned old mines, streets were located to avoid the mines.

Climate

Demographics

2020 census
As of the census of 2020, the population was 11,836. The racial makeup of the city was 90.9% White, 2.2% Black or African American, 2.0% Asian, 0.2% Native American, 1.2% from other races, and 3.4% from two or more races. Ethnically, the population was 3.1% Hispanic or Latino of any race.

The 2020 census population of the city included 2,858 people in student housing.

According  to the American Community Survey estimates for 2016-2020, the median income for a household in the city was $42,626, and the median income for a family was $75,625. Male full-time workers had a median income of $43,303 versus $31,915 for female workers. The per capita income for the city was $20,781. About 7.5% of families and 30.0% of the population were below the poverty line, including 16.4% of those under age 18 and 13.8% of those age 65 or over. Of the population age 25 and over, 95.1% were high school graduates or higher and 41.8% had a bachelor's degree or higher.

2010 census 
As of the census of 2010, there were 11,224 people, 3,644 households, and 1,598 families residing in the city. The racial makeup of the city was 94.7% White, 2.1% African American, 0.2% Native American, 1.7% Asian, 0.3% from other races, and 1.0% from two or more races. Hispanic or Latino of any race were 1.6% of the population.

There were 3,644 households, of which 18.2% had children under the age of 18 living with them, 32.7% were married couples living together, 7.8% had a female householder with no husband present, 3.3% had a male householder with no wife present, and 56.1% were non-families. 31.4% of all households were made up of individuals, and 11.6% had someone living alone who was 65 years of age or older. The average household size was 2.32 and the average family size was 2.80.

The median age in the city was 22.4 years. 11.3% of residents were under the age of 18; 49.4% were between the ages of 18 and 24; 14.3% were from 25 to 44; 14.3% were from 45 to 64; and 10.7% were 65 years of age or older. The gender makeup of the city was 56.3% male and 43.7% female.

2000 census 
As of the census of 2000, there were 9,989 people, 3,312 households, and 1,692 families residing in the city. The population density was 2,376.4 people per square mile (918.3/km2). There were 3,482 housing units at an average density of 828.4 per square mile (320.1/km2). The racial makeup of the city was 96.15% White, 1.12% Black or African American, 0.27% Native American, 1.40% Asian, 0.04% Pacific Islander, 0.27% from other races, and 0.75% from two or more races. 0.88% of the population were Hispanic or Latino of any race.
There were 3,312 households, out of which 22.2% had children under the age of 18 living with them, 40.0% were married couples living together, 8.0% had a female householder with no husband present, and 48.9% were non-families. 32.2% of all households were made up of individuals, and 13.0% had someone living alone who was 65 years of age or older. The average household size was 2.31 and the average family size was 2.86.

In the city, the population was spread out, with 14.4% under the age of 18, 41.3% from 18 to 24, 17.5% from 25 to 44, 14.4% from 45 to 64, and 12.3% who were 65 years of age or older. The median age was 23 years. For every 100 females, there were 119.3 males. For every 100 females age 18 and over, there were 120.6 males.

The median income for a household in the city was $35,742, and the median income for a family was $50,583. Males had a median income of $31,424 versus $21,896 for females. The per capita income for the city was $15,858. About 4.6% of families and 19.4% of the population were below the poverty line, including 12.2% of those under age 18 and 8.3% of those age 65 or over.

Transportation

Aside from Platteville Municipal Airport (KPVB), which serves the city and surrounding communities for general aviation, Platteville has minimal commercial air access. The closest airport with any regularly-scheduled commercial service is Dubuque Regional Airport, and the closest airport with regularly-scheduled commercial international flights is Chicago O'Hare International Airport.

Platteville's primary road access is via U.S. Route 151, which acts as an expressway for the region; US 151 has three exits near the city center. Wisconsin state routes 80 and 81 also serve Platteville, cutting through the central business district as sort of a "main street".

Platteville Public Transportation provides the community with bus service and paratransit service.

Platteville no longer has railroad service.  It was previously served by the Chicago & Northwestern Railroad (C&NW) via an 8-mile branch off the Montfort Junction to Galena line at Ipswich.  The line entered Platteville from the east-southeast and curved around to the north.  The line then joined the Chicago, Milwaukee, St. Paul and Pacific (Milwaukee Road). This in effect created a large 180° curve in the southeastern part of Platteville where the mines, depots and other rail-dependent industries were located. The Milwaukee Road branch continued on to the ENE then east for 17 miles where it branched off another Milwaukee Road branch line to Mineral Point at the town of Calamine. Passenger service ended on the C&NW in 1951 and was replaced by mixed train service on the Milwaukee Road in 1952.  Freight service continued on the Milwaukee Road until 1974 when the line was abandoned and pulled up.  It left the C&NW moving only a few cars per week which applied to abandon the route.  The abandonment was granted in 1980 and the line was pulled up forever ending railroad service to Platteville.

Education 
The Platteville School District serves the Platteville area. Platteville High School is the area's public high school. Platteville High School's mascot is "Henry Hillmen". The University of Wisconsin–Platteville is located in Platteville.

Culture 
The main source of culture in Platteville is the Center for the Arts on University of Wisconsin–Platteville campus, which sponsors a steady stream of well-attended professional touring events.

Attractions 
The Mining and Rollo Jamison Museums
At the museums one can tour Lorenzo Bevan's 1845 lead mine, ride a 1931 zinc mine train, and view many exhibits on Platteville's mining history as well as Rollo Jamison's personal collection of artifacts.
Stone Cottage
Built in 1837 by the Rev. Samuel Mitchell, this home still contains many of the original furnishings. The home was a home of the Major John Rountree, one of Platteville's founders. The walls are two feet thick and made of dolomite Galena limestone.

The Big M

The M is a monogram for the former Wisconsin Mining School (now the University of Wisconsin–Platteville).

The first M was first constructed in 1936 when two men, Raymond Medley and Alvin Knoerr climbed the Platte Mound and trudged through 2 feet of snow to form a huge letter M. Actual construction of the stone M began in the spring of 1937 and was completed in the fall of the same year.

The M is composed of rocks laid on Platte Mound and is whitewashed every year. The M is 241-feet tall, 214-feet wide and legs that are 25-feet wide.

The M can be seen many places in Platteville and sometimes in Iowa, on a clear day. Atop the Platte Mound and the M viewers can see three states: Wisconsin, Iowa, and Illinois.

The M is lit once a year during the University of Wisconsin – Platteville college homecoming.

Notable people

Politicians 

 William Carter, Wisconsin State Representative
 S. Wesley Clark, Attorney General of South Dakota
 Kearton Coates, Wisconsin State Representative
 Thomas Cruson, Wisconsin Territorial legislator
 James Dolan, Wisconsin State Representative
 Ensign Dickinson, Wisconsin State Representative
 Charles E. Estabrook, Wisconsin Attorney General
 Neely Gray, Wisconsin territorial legislator and businessman
 John L. Grindell, Wisconsin State Representative
 Jon R. Guiles, Wisconsin State Representative
 James V. Holland, Wisconsin State Representative
 Thomas Jenkins, Wisconsin State Representative
 Arthur W. Kopp, U.S. Representative
 James B. McCoy, Wisconsin State Representative
 Duncan McGregor, Wisconsin State Representative
 Ray Meiklejohn, Canadian politician
 Christopher C. Miller, Acting United States Secretary of Defense
 Jonathan Baker Moore, Wisconsin State Representative and Union Army general
 James William Murphy, U.S. Representative
 Hanmer Robbins, Wisconsin State Representative
 Gordon Roseleip, Wisconsin State Senator
 John H. Rountree, Wisconsin State Senator
 A. C. Schultz, Wisconsin State Representative
 George Slack, Wisconsin State Representative
 Harry E. Stephens, Wisconsin State Representative
 Robert S. Travis, Wisconsin State Senator
 Adelbert L. Utt, Wisconsin State Representative
 James Russell Vineyard, Wisconsin and California politician
 Noah Virgin, Wisconsin State Senator
 Benjamin Webster, Wisconsin State Representative
 Conrad J. Weittenhiller, Wisconsin State Representative

Others

 Scott Adams, early computer game publisher and designer
 John Fiedler, voice actor and character actor in stage, film, television and radio
 Herbert Spencer Gasser, physiologist and recipient of the Nobel Prize for Physiology or Medicine in 1944
 Geoff Herbach, novelist
 Cosette Kies, librarian, writer, ad academic
 Herbert T. Perrin, U.S. Brigadier General and Distinguished Service Cross recipient
 Josiah Little Pickard, educator
 Pants Rowland, manager of 1917 World Series champion Chicago White Sox

Gallery

See also 
 Platteville Municipal Airport
 Dick's Supermarket

References

External links 

 City of Platteville
 Platteville Chamber of Commerce
 Platteville Mining Museum and Rollo Jamison Museum
 University of Wisconsin–Platteville
Platteville Main Street Program
 Sanborn fire insurance maps: 1884 1892 1900 1908 1915

Cities in Wisconsin
Cities in Grant County, Wisconsin
Micropolitan areas of Wisconsin